The Lakeland Magic are an American professional basketball team in the NBA G League based in Lakeland, Florida, and are affiliated with the Orlando Magic. The Magic began play in the 2017–18 season and play their home games at the RP Funding Center.

The franchise was previously based out of Erie, Pennsylvania, and known as the Erie BayHawks.

History

Erie BayHawks (2008–2017)

The Erie BayHawks were established in 2008 as an expansion team in the NBA Development League (D-League), originally affiliated with the Cleveland Cavaliers and the Philadelphia 76ers. The "BayHawks" name alluded to the Presque Isle Bay, on which the city of Erie lies. The hawk represents the city's wildlife and naval history, especially because hawks were used by naval expeditions to send important messages. The team's colors of black, red, and gold paid homage to the Erie-based Commodore Oliver Hazard Perry and to the United States Navy uniforms worn during the War of 1812. The team was affiliated with the Toronto Raptors from 2009 to 2011. The team home court was Erie Insurance Arena.

The affiliation with the Cavaliers lasted until 2011 when Cleveland obtained their own affiliate in the Canton Charge. The BayHawks then affiliated with the New York Knicks. Under the Knicks' affiliation, the BayHawks made headlines on January 17, 2012, when Jeremy Lin was assigned to the team. On January 20, he had a triple-double with 28 points, 11 rebounds, and 12 assists in the BayHawks' 122–113 victory over the Maine Red Claws. Lin was recalled by the Knicks three days later. In December 2012, the Knicks assigned NBA veteran Amar'e Stoudemire to the BayHawks because of an injury.

In 2012, the Knicks offered the BayHawks head coach position to Patrick Ewing, one of their most prominent alumni. However, he turned down the offer citing his desire to coach in the National Basketball Association as opposed to the D-League. Ewing has worked as an assistant coach for the Washington Wizards, Houston Rockets, and Orlando Magic.

In 2014, the Knicks ended their affiliation with Erie in favor of starting an expansion D-League franchise, the Westchester Knicks, forcing the BayHawks to find a new affiliate. In April 2014, the BayHawks entered talks for a hybrid relationship with the Orlando Magic and a deal was announced May 19, 2014.

Lakeland Magic (2017–present)

In January 2016, the Magic announced their intentions to have their own D-League team in Florida, but stated that it would be an expansion team and not a relocation of the Erie BayHawks. In the original January 6, 2016, announcement, it was announced that the Orlando Magic was seeking to place a D-League team in Florida; the eight initial candidate venues were: Bay Lake (ESPN Wide World of Sports Complex), Daytona Beach (Ocean Center), Estero (Germain Arena), Fort Myers (Lee Civic Center), Jacksonville (Jacksonville Veterans Memorial Arena), Kissimmee (Silver Spurs Arena), Lakeland (Lakeland Center), and Orlando (CFE Arena). On February 17, the Magic narrowed their choices down to Bay Lake, Jacksonville, Lakeland, and Kissimmee. On June 30, the Magic named Kissimmee and Lakeland as the two finalists.

However, in December 2016, the Magic announced that they had purchased the BayHawks' franchise and that they would be relocating it to Lakeland, Florida, for the 2017–18 season, becoming the seventeenth NBA team to own a D-League franchise. They would also build a practice facility in nearby Winter Haven. On April 12, 2017, it was announced that the team would be named the Lakeland Magic. On August 8, 2017, Stan Heath was named as the head coach and Anthony Parker as the general manager.

In response to the purchase, the BayHawks' local management and former owners also announced that they were attempting to secure another franchise to replace the now Magic-owned BayHawks franchise to play in Erie. In January 2017, it was announced that the Atlanta Hawks would temporarily place their D-League affiliate in Erie for the 2017–18 and 2018–19 seasons under the operations of the former BayHawks management as a new BayHawks team. The Atlanta Hawks had already announced their intentions of placing their D-League franchise in College Park, Georgia, for the 2019–20 season. Before the 2017–18 season, the league rebranded to the NBA G League via a sponsorship with Gatorade.

The Magic won the league championship in the COVID-19 pandemic-shortened season in 2021. Head coach Heath won coach of the year and then took the head coaching position with the Eastern Michigan Eagles. Associate coach Joe Barrer was then named his replacement. Anthony Parker was promoted to assistant general manager in Orlando and Adetunji Adedipe was promoted to general manager in October 2021 after serving as an assistant manager since 2017 and working for the Magic organization since 2015.

Season by season

Current roster

Head coaches

High points

Individual awards

NBADL All-Rookie Second Team
 Tasmin Mitchell - 2011
Payton Siva

All-NBADL First Team
 Erik Daniels - 2009
 Ivan Johnson - 2011

All-NBADL Third Team
 Alade Aminu - 2010

NBADL All-Defensive Second Team
 Ivan Johnson - 2011

All-Star Weekend

All-Star Game
 Erik Daniels - 2009
 Alade Aminu - 2010
 Ivan Johnson - 2011
 Garrett Temple - 2011
 Seth Curry - 2015

NBA affiliates

Erie BayHawks (2008–2017)
 Cleveland Cavaliers (2008–2011)
 New York Knicks (2011–2014)
 Orlando Magic (2014–2017)
 Philadelphia 76ers (2008–2009)
 Toronto Raptors (2009–2011)

Lakeland Magic
 Orlando Magic (2017–present)

See also
College Park Skyhawks, basketball team that assumed the Erie Bayhawks name following this team's relocation to Lakeland
Erie BayHawks (2019–), third basketball franchise to use the BayHawks' name

Notes
 Alade Aminu was traded to the Bakersfield Jam after 37 games with the BayHawks.

References

External links
 

 
2008 establishments in Pennsylvania
Basketball teams established in 2008
Basketball teams in Florida
Events in Lakeland, Florida
Orlando Magic
Sports in Lakeland, Florida
Sports in Erie, Pennsylvania